Adrapsa geometroides is a moth of the family Noctuidae first described by Francis Walker in 1858. It is found in Indian subregion, Sri Lanka. to Sundaland and New Guinea.

References

Moths of Asia
Moths described in 1858
Herminiinae